Bank of Iraq is an Iraqi bank, formerly known as Iraqi Socialist Bank. It was founded in 1991 and it is the smallest of the state-owned banks with four branches. Total assets were $8.4 million as of 2003.

See also
Iraqi dinar

References
 http://www.cbi.iq/index.php?pid=IraqFinancialInst

Companies based in Baghdad
Banks of Iraq
Banks established in 1991
Iraqi companies established in 1991